Gerald Hugh Tyrwhitt-Wilson, 14th Baron Berners (18 September 188319 April 1950), also known as Gerald Tyrwhitt, was a British composer, novelist, painter, and aesthete. He was also known as  Lord Berners.

Biography

Early life and education
Berners was born in Apley Hall, Stockton, Shropshire, in 1883, as Gerald Hugh Tyrwhitt, son of The Honorable Hugh Tyrwhitt (1856–1907) and his wife Julia (1861–1931), daughter of William Orme Foster, Apley's owner. His father, a Royal Navy officer, was rarely home. He was brought up by a grandmother who was extremely religious and self-righteous, and a mother who had little intellect and many prejudices. His mother, who was the daughter of a rich ironmaster, and who with a strong interest in fox hunting, ignored his musical interests and instead focused on developing his masculinity, a trait Berners found to be inherently unnatural. Berners later wrote, "My father was worldly, cynical, intolerant of any kind of inferiority, reserved and self-possessed. My mother was unworldly, naïve, impulsive and undecided, and in my father's presence she was always at her worst".

Berners was educated at Cheam School and Eton College, then studied in France and Germany while attempting to pass entry examination for the Foreign Office. He twice failed the examination but instead served as an honorary attache in Constantinople from 1909 to 1911 and then at Rome until after succeeding to his peerage in 1918.

Adult life
In 1918, Berners became the 14th holder of the Berners Barony, after inheriting the title, property, and money from an uncle. His inheritance included Faringdon House, in Faringdon, Oxfordshire, which he initially gave to his mother and her second husband; on their deaths in 1931 he moved into the house himself.  In 1932, Berners fell in love with Robert Heber-Percy, 28 years his junior, who became his companion and moved into Faringdon House.  Unexpectedly, Heber-Percy married a 21-year-old woman, Jennifer Fry, who had a baby nine months later.  For a short time, she and the baby lived at Faringdon House with Heber-Percy and Berners.

As well as being a talented musician, Berners was a skilled artist and writer.  He appears in many books and biographies of the period, notably portrayed as Lord Merlin in Nancy Mitford's The Pursuit of Love. He was a friend of the Mitford family and close to Diana Guinness.

Berners was notorious for his eccentricity, dyeing pigeons at his house in Faringdon in vibrant colours and at one point entertaining Penelope Betjeman's horse Moti to tea. There were paper flowers in the garden and the interior of the house was adorned with joke books and joke notices, such as "Mangling Done Here". As a visitor, Patrick Leigh Fermor, recalled:

Other visitors to Faringdon included Igor Stravinsky, Salvador Dalí, H. G. Wells, and Tom Driberg.

His Rolls-Royce automobile contained a small clavichord keyboard which could be stored beneath the front seat. Near his house he had a 100-foot viewing tower, Faringdon Folly, constructed as a birthday present in 1935 for Heber-Percy, a notice at the entrance reading: "Members of the Public committing suicide from this tower do so at their own risk". Berners also drove around his estate wearing a pig's-head mask to frighten the locals.

He was subject throughout his life to periods of depression which became more pronounced during the Second World War, when he had a nervous breakdown. He lived in lodgings for a period in Oxford where his friend Maurice Bowra got him a job cataloguing books. Following the production of his last ballet Les Sirènes (1946) he lost his eyesight.

Death and epitaph
He died in 1950 aged 66 at Faringdon House, bequeathing his estate to Robert Heber-Percy, who lived there until his own death in 1987. His ashes are buried in the lawn near the house.

Berners wrote his own epitaph, which appears on his gravestone: 
Here lies Lord Berners
One of the learners
His great love of learning
May earn him a burning
But, Praise the Lord!
He seldom was bored.

Music

Berners' early music, written during his period at the British embassy in Rome during World War I, was avant-garde in style. These are mostly songs (in English, French and German) and piano pieces, many written using his original name, Gerald Tyrwhitt. Later pieces were composed in a more accessible style, such as the Trois morceaux, Fantaisie espagnole (1919), Fugue in C minor (1924), and several ballets, including The Triumph of Neptune (1926) (based on a story by Sacheverell Sitwell) and Luna Park, commissioned for a C. B. Cochran London revue in 1930. His final three ballets, A Wedding Bouquet, Cupid and Psyche and Les Sirènes, were all written in collaboration with his friends Frederick Ashton (as choreographer) and Constant Lambert (as music director).

Berners was also friendly with William Walton. Walton dedicated Belshazzar's Feast to Berners, and Lambert arranged a Caprice péruvien for orchestra, from Lord Berners' opera Le carrosse du St Sacrement. There are also scores for two films: The Halfway House (1943) and Nicholas Nickleby (1947), for which Ealing’s music director, Ernest Irving, provided the orchestrations.

Berners himself once said that he would have been a better composer if he had accepted fewer lunch invitations. However, English composer Gavin Bryars, quoted in Peter Dickinson’s biography of Berners, disagrees saying: "If he had spent more time on his music he could have become a duller composer". Dinah Birch,  reviewing The Mad Boy, Lord Berners, My Grandmother and Me, a biography of Berners written by Robert's granddaughter, Sofka Zinovieff, concurs saying: "Had he committed himself to composition as his life's work, perhaps his legacy would have been more substantial. But his music might have been less innovative, for its amateur quality — 'amateur in the best sense', as Stravinsky insisted — is inseparable from its distinctive flair".

Berners was the subject of BBC Radio 3's Composer of the Week programmes in December 2014.

Literature
Berners wrote four autobiographical works and some novels, mostly of a humorous nature. All were published and some went into translations. His autobiographies First Childhood (1934), A Distant Prospect (1945), The Château de Résenlieu (published posthumously) and Dresden are both witty and affectionate.

Berners obtained some notoriety for his roman à clef The Girls of Radcliff Hall (punning on the name of the famous lesbian writer), initially published privately under the pseudonym "Adela Quebec", in which he depicts himself and his circle of friends, such as Cecil Beaton and Oliver Messel, as members of a girls' school. This frivolous satire, which was privately published and distributed, had a modish success in the 1930s. The original edition is rare; rumour has it that Beaton was responsible for gathering most of the already scarce copies of the book and destroying them. However, the book was reprinted in 2000 with the help of Dorothy Lygon.

His other novels, including Romance of a Nose, Count Omega and The Camel are a mixture of whimsy and gentle satire.

Bibliography

Fiction
 1936 – The Camel
 1937 – The Girls of Radcliff Hall
 1941 – Far From the Madding War
 1941 – Count Omega
 1941 – Percy Wallingford and Mr. Pidger
 1941 – The Romance of a Nose
[See Collected Tales and Fantasies, New York, 1999]

Non-fiction
 1934 – First Childhood
 1945 – A Distant Prospect
 2000 - The Chateau de Resenlieu
 2008 - Dresden

Legacy 
In January 2016, he was played by actor Christopher Godwin in episode 3 of the BBC Radio 4 drama What England Owes.

See also
 Lord Berners profiled in Loved Ones, a book of pen portraits by close friend Diana Mitford.

Sources

References

External links
 
 Oxfordshire Blue Plaque to Lord Berners erected on Faringdon Folly on 6 April 2013.

1883 births
1950 deaths
19th-century English LGBT people
20th-century English LGBT people
20th-century classical composers
English classical composers
English opera composers
Male opera composers
English male classical composers
British ballet composers
English film score composers
English male film score composers
People educated at Eton College
People from Faringdon
LGBT classical composers
LGBT film score composers
English autobiographers
English gay writers
LGBT classical musicians
LGBT peers
Literary peers
Musicians who were peers
English LGBT novelists
English male novelists
20th-century English novelists
20th-century English composers
English LGBT politicians
20th-century English male writers
English male non-fiction writers
20th-century British male musicians
14
20th-century English nobility